Dokuro may refer to:

 Dokuro (film), a 1927 silent film
 Dokuro (video game), a 2012 video game